Dan Harris  is a former American football coach and college athletics administrator.  He was the head football coach at Baker University in Baldwin City, Kansas.  He held that position for the 1991 season.  His coaching record at Baker 6–2–1.

Harris later became athletic director at the school, where he retired in 2009 after being named the "Under Armour Athletic Director of the Year" for the central division.

Head coaching record

References

Year of birth missing (living people)
Living people
Baker Wildcats athletic directors
Baker Wildcats football coaches